Sivandi is an Iranian language spoken in Fars Province, Iran, one of five listed in Ethnologue which together have 35,000 speakers.

References

External links 
 Encyclopædia Iranica article on Fars Dialects
 sivandi language 

Languages of Iran
Northwestern Iranian languages